"Conteo" is the second single by Don Omar taken from his album King of Kings. It was featured on the soundtrack to the 2006 film The Fast and the Furious: Tokyo Drift. and was the first song played during the ending credits. In the album version it features rapper Juelz Santana but in the movie version Santana's verse is not included.

Music video
The video for the single features Don Omar and scenes from the 2006 car movie Tokyo Drift interspersed. The video is also featured on the DVD of The Fast and the Furious: Tokyo Drift as well as on the DVD of the deluxe re-release album King of Kings: Armageddon Edition.

Official versions
''Conteo only has two official versions, appearing on different albums.

 There's a version which Don Omar sings without Juelz Santana, and is the version promoting The Fast and the Furious: Tokyo Drift and the soundtrack.
 The version with both Don Omar and Juelz Santana appears on King of Kings.

Chart positions

References

2006 singles
Spanish-language songs
Don Omar songs
Juelz Santana songs
Music videos directed by Jessy Terrero
Songs written for films
2006 songs
Songs written by Don Omar
Machete Music singles
Fast & Furious music